Duanzhou District is a district of Zhaoqing, Guangdong province, People's Republic of China. Duanzhou is the urban center of Zhaoqing.

Administrative divisions

 Defunct: Chengbei Subdistrict & Chengnan Subdistrict

References

Zhaoqing
County-level divisions of Guangdong